Maurice Davène (7 March 1891 – 4 June 1969) was a French weightlifter. He competed in the men's light heavyweight event at the 1920 Summer Olympics.

References

External links
 

1891 births
1969 deaths
French male weightlifters
Olympic weightlifters of France
Weightlifters at the 1920 Summer Olympics
Place of birth missing